Sohrab Gilani (born in 1960 in Shushtar, Khuzestan province) is a principlist representative of Shushtar and Gotvand in the Islamic Consultative Assembly (the Parliament of Iran) who was elected at the 11th Majles elections on 21 February 2020 and captured approximately 32,000 votes.

Gilani who is a Twelver Shia Muslim, is considered as one of the 18 representatives of Khuzestan provinces at the current "Islamic Consultative Assembly" (11th parliament).

Sohrab-Gilani's electoral rivals (in the 11th parliament elections) were: Seyyed Mohammad Sadat Ebrahimi 29910 votes, Ali Bani Agbeh 23280 votes, Abbas Nouri 10909 votes, Ismail Taghipour 635 votes and Nader Mohammad Shoushtari 317 votes.

See also
 List of Iran's parliament representatives (11th term)
 Hamidreza Moghaddamfar

References

Members of the Islamic Consultative Assembly by term
Members of the 11th Islamic Consultative Assembly
Iranian politicians
Living people
1960 births
People from Khuzestan Province
People from Shushtar
Islamic Revolutionary Guard Corps second brigadier generals